Walker King (1751 – 22 February 1827) was an English churchman and man of letters, bishop of Rochester from 1809, and, together with French Laurence, co-editor of the works of Edmund Burke.

Life
King was the son of the Reverend James King of Clitheroe, Lancashire, and Anne, daughter of John Walker, of Underhill. James King was his elder brother; his father later became Dean of Raphoe. He was educated at Sedbergh School and later matriculated at Brasenose College, Oxford on 20 February 1768, aged 16. King migrated to Corpus Christi College, Oxford, graduating B.A. in 1771, M.A. in 1775, B.D. and D.D. in 1788. He became a Fellow of Corpus Christi.

In his clerical career, he was prebendary of Peterborough, 1794, canon of Wells, 1796, prebendary of Canterbury, 1803, and prebendary of Westminster, 1827. He was Bishop of Rochester from 1809. He died on 22 February 1827.

Works
King served as the main editor for the later volumes of Burke's Works. The edition he prepared with Laurence was in eight volumes, appearing 1792 to 1827.

Family
King married Sarah, daughter of Edward Dawson. His son the Ven Walker King was archdeacon of Rochester and father of Edward King. Walker's great-grandson, Reverend Robert Stuart King, once played football for the English national side.

References

1751 births
1827 deaths
Bishops of Rochester
Canons of Westminster
Alumni of Corpus Christi College, Oxford
19th-century Church of England bishops